Walter José Moreno (born 18 May 1978) is a Colombian footballer who currently plays for Unión Comercio in the Primera División Peruana.

He was one of the pillars in defense for Cúcuta Deportivo in their historic 2006 run.

Honors
 Champions Colombian Primera A, 2006 Cúcuta Deportivo
 Semifinalist of Copa Libertadores, 2007 Cúcuta Deportivo

External links

1978 births
Living people
Colombian footballers
Colombia international footballers
Boyacá Chicó F.C. footballers
Atlético Nacional footballers
Cúcuta Deportivo footballers
Deportivo Táchira F.C. players
A.C.C.D. Mineros de Guayana players
Unión Comercio footballers
Categoría Primera A players
Categoría Primera B players
Peruvian Primera División players
Colombian expatriate footballers
Expatriate footballers in Venezuela
Expatriate footballers in Peru
Association football defenders
Footballers from Cali